Bollito may refer to:

Bollito misto, an Italian cuisine dish of "mixed" boiled meats
Bollito de carita, a black eyed pea fritter
Bolita, the Spanish language word for little ball and a type of lottery
Bolito, an Italian language name for a numbers game